Christian Hoff (born April 21, 1968) is an American actor.

Biography
Hoff was born in San Francisco, California, and later moved with his family to San Diego. At eight years old he began acting at the San Diego Junior Theater, and not long after was playing Winthrop in The Music Man.

Career
Since then he has appeared on numerous television, big screen and Broadway shows. Most recently, he had a guest role as Marty on All My Children.

He starred until 2008 in the original cast production of Jersey Boys which opened at the August Wilson theater on Broadway in 2005. His dynamic portrayal of Tommy DeVito, one of the founding members of Four Seasons musical group, won him the "Best Featured Actor in a Musical" Tony award in 2006. He was scheduled to return to Broadway in the Roundabout Theatre's 2008 production of Pal Joey in the title role; however  due to an injury he was forced to leave the production.

He is currently with The Midtown Men, a group that consist of four former cast members of Jersey Boys who perform music from the 1960s.
Hoff holds the world record for "Most Character Voices in an Audio Book" for Tell Me How You Love the Picture, based on the career of movie producer Ed Feldman. In it, he performs 241 separate voices.

Personal life
He is married to the actress Melissa Hoff and together they have three daughters: Elizabeth, Evelyn and Ella. Christian has two children from a previous marriage: Eli and Erika.

Filmography

 All My Children
 In Love and War
 ER
 Evening Shade
 Growing Pains
 JAG
 Kids Incorporated
 Law & Order: Criminal Intent
 Star Trek IV: The Voyage Home
 Millennium
 Party of Five
 Richie Rich
 The Commish
 Quincy, M.E.
 Quantum Leap
 Who's the Boss?
 Ugly Betty
 Law & Order: Special Victims Unit

Stage
 Jersey Boys (Tommy DeVito, Original Cast Album)
 Pal Joey (Joey Evans, injured during previews)
 The Who's Tommy (Pinball Lad, Original Cast Album)
 Jesus Christ Superstar (King Herod)
 George M! (George M. Cohan)
 The Will Rogers Follies (Will Rogers)

References

External links
 Christian Hoff official website
 Christian Hoff official weblog
 
 

1968 births
Living people
American male child actors
American male musical theatre actors
American male television actors
Male actors from San Diego
Male actors from San Francisco
Tony Award winners
20th-century American male actors
21st-century American male actors
American male film actors